Limnellia fallax is a species of fly in the family Ephydridae. It is found in the  Palearctic.

Distribution
Austria, Czech Republic, Finland, Germany, Hungary, Poland.

References

Ephydridae
Insects described in 1903
Taxa named by Leander Czerny
Diptera of Europe